Justin Todd Coffey (born September 9, 1980) is an American former professional baseball pitcher. He played in Major League Baseball (MLB) for the Cincinnati Reds, Milwaukee Brewers, Washington Nationals and Los Angeles Dodgers. He was born in Forest City, North Carolina.

Career

Cincinnati Reds
Coffey was drafted by the Cincinnati Reds in the 41st round of the 1998 Major League Baseball draft out of Chase High School in Forest City, North Carolina. A draft-and-follow prospect, Coffey signed with the Reds for a $1,000 signing bonus and $850 monthly salary.

Coffey missed the 2000 season because of an elbow injury and remained in the Reds minor league system through 2005. He made his major league debut on April 19, 2005, pitching two innings and giving up two runs against the Chicago Cubs. He picked up his first win in a two inning relief appearance against the San Diego Padres on May 10, 2005, and his first save against the Pittsburgh Pirates on August 28, 2005. Overall, he spent four years with the Reds and pitched in 213 games, with a 12–9 record and 4.62 ERA and 9 saves, 8 of which he recorded in 2006.

Milwaukee Brewers

On September 9, 2008, Coffey was designated for assignment by the Reds and claimed by the Milwaukee Brewers on September 12.

On April 22, 2009, Coffey made an appearance as the closer for the Brewers; he held the role until Trevor Hoffman returned from an injury. He picked up two saves in that role, while also suffering 2 blown saves. He remained with the Brewers through 2010 and was 2–4 with a 4.76 ERA in 69 games.

On December 2, 2010, the Brewers announced the team would not offer him arbitration and he became a free agent.

Washington Nationals

Coffey signed with the Washington Nationals on January 24, 2011. He finished the year with a 3.62 ERA  and 5–1 record in 69 games before again becoming a free agent.

Los Angeles Dodgers
On February 3, 2012, Coffey signed a one-year, $1 million contract with the Los Angeles Dodgers that contained a 2013 club option worth $2.5 million. Coffey pitched in 23 games for the Dodgers, with an ERA of 4.66. However, on July 2, Coffey injured his shoulder while pitching against the Cincinnati Reds. On July 3, it was announced that Coffey would undergo Tommy John surgery for the second time of his career and miss the rest of the 2012 season. The Dodgers declined his 2013 option on October 29, 2012.

Seattle Mariners
On May 20, 2014, Coffey signed a minor league deal with the Seattle Mariners. Coffey passed his physical on May 22, making the deal official. He served as the closer for the Mariners' Triple-A team the Tacoma Rainiers for the remainder of the season, and was released on 4 September.

Atlanta Braves
On February 11, 2015, Coffey signed a minor league contract with the Atlanta Braves.

Diablos Rojos del Mexico
He spent part of 2015 pitching for the Diablos Rojos del Mexico in the Mexican League.

Long Island Ducks
On April 8, 2016, Coffey signed with the Long Island Ducks of the Atlantic League of Professional Baseball. He became a free agent after the 2016 season.

Pitching style
Coffey mainly threw two pitches: a sinking fastball that went up to 95–96 mph, and a sharp dropping slider at 81–82 mph.

He was known for his full-speed sprints from the bullpen to the mound when he was brought into games. According to Coffey, this started when he was in Cincinnati, when he was so distracted while warming up, he wasn't aware that it was his time to pitch, and he quickly ran from the bullpen onto the mound, and the run caused so much of a rush in Coffey, he chose to continue the sprint to the pitching mound from then on.
As a result, the Brewers introduced a "Coffey Time!" graphic on the scoreboard that kept track of Coffey's time to sprint from the bullpen to the pitcher's mound after getting called out to pitch. Also, while with the Brewers, Coffey's intro music was the entrance music of the pro wrestler The Ultimate Warrior, who would run full-sprint to the ring as his entrance.

References

External links

1980 births
Living people
American expatriate baseball players in Mexico
Baseball players from North Carolina
Billings Mustangs players
Dayton Dragons players
Chattanooga Lookouts players
Cincinnati Reds players
Diablos Rojos del México players
Gulf Coast Reds players
Long Island Ducks players
Los Angeles Dodgers players
Louisville Bats players
Major League Baseball pitchers
Mexican League baseball pitchers
Milwaukee Brewers players
Nashville Sounds players
People from Forest City, North Carolina
Potomac Cannons players
Rancho Cucamonga Quakes players
Scottsdale Scorpions players
Tacoma Rainiers players
Washington Nationals players